Laura Whittingham (born 6 June 1986) is an English female athlete who competes in the javelin. She has a personal best distance of 60.68 metres.

Athletics career
Whittingham competed at the 2010 Commonwealth Games in Delhi, India just missing a bronze medal by finishing 4th.

She has won three British titles in 2017, 2018 and 2019 and has reached 3rd place on the British all time rankings with the new specification javelin which was introduced in 1999.

References

1986 births
Living people
British female javelin throwers
English female javelin throwers
Commonwealth Games competitors for England
Athletes (track and field) at the 2010 Commonwealth Games
British Athletics Championships winners